Paolo il caldo (in English: Hot Paolo) is a novel by Vitaliano Brancati, and also of a 1974 Italian film based on that novel.

Novel
The novel is set in Catania and in Rome around the time of the Second World War.  It tells the story of a Sicilian baron who gives in to desires of the flesh, beginning at an early age and continuing through his adulthood, when he realizes what an empty life he has led.  The book explores the themes of sexual passion and of lust, sometimes unbridled and morbid.

The novel was published in 1955, a year after the author's death.  Its publication was authorized in a note that Brancati penned two days before his passing, in which he explained that the planned two final chapters of the novel had not been written.

Movie

The Sensual Man is loosely based on Brancati's novel, with the screenplay written by Marco Vicario.  Vicario also directed the movie, that was played by Giancarlo Giannini in the role of Paolo and Rossana Podestà as Lilia.

References

External links

20th-century Italian novels
1974 films
1977 films
Novels set in Italy
Catania
Novels set in Rome
1955 novels
Novels published posthumously